Richard Beardsell (born 19 January 1979) is a track and field sprint athlete who competes as a Masters athlete for Great Britain.

Personal Bests

References

1979 births
Living people